Elizabeth Tyler may refer to:

 Elizabeth Tyler (1823–1850), daughter of John Tyler, President of the United States
 Elizabeth Tyler (KKK organizer) (1881–1924), Atlanta public-relations professional and Ku Klux Klan organizer